James or Jimmy Cochrane may refer to:

James Cochrane (politician) (1852–1905), Canadian construction contractor and mayor of Montreal, Quebec, 1902–1904
James Cochrane (judge) (1798–1883), chief justice of Gibraltar
James Aikman Cochrane (1888–?), Scottish soldier of the British Army
James Kilvington Cochrane (1873–1948), British Army officer during the First World War
Jimmy Cochrane (footballer, born 1935), English football forward for Birmingham and Walsall
Jimmy Cochrane (footballer, born 1954), Scottish football fullback for Middlesbrough, Darlington and Torquay
J. Harwood Cochrane (James Harwood Cochrane, 1912–2016), American businessman

See also
James Cochran (disambiguation)
James Cochrane Dobbin (1814–1857), politician and lawyer